Tupanciretã is a municipality of the western part of the state of Rio Grande do Sul, Brazil. The population is 24,068 (2020 est.) in an area of 2251.86 km². Its elevation is 465 m.  The name comes from the Tupi language.  It is located west of the state capital of Porto Alegre and northeast of Alegrete.

Neighboring municipalities
Cruz Alta
Júlio de Castilhos

References

External links
http://www.citybrazil.com.br/rs/tupancireta/ 
 Anthem of the municipality of Tupanciretã

Municipalities in Rio Grande do Sul